This is the list of supermarket chains in South Africa. 
 SEGWAGWA Cash n Carry
 Advance Cash n Carry
 7 Eleven (OK Franchise)
 Boxer
 Cambridge Food
 Checkers
 Checkers Hyper
 Checkout
 Choppies
 Devland Metro Cash & Carry
 Friendly (OK Franchise)
 Discount Cash & Carry 
 Food Lover's Market
 Foodzone Group
 Game Stores
 Jumbo Cash & Carry
 Kit Kat Group
 Makro
 MEGASAVE (Cash & Carry)
 OK Grocer
 OK Minimark
 OK Value
 Pick n Pay Stores
 Rhino Cash & Carry
 Shoprite
 ShopriteHyper
 Spar
 AM:PM (Online Supermarket) 
 Br!ng (Online Supermarket)
 Woolworths
 USave
 USave Superstore
 Checkstar
 BIBI Cash and Carry

See also
 List of supermarket chains in Africa
 List of supermarket chains

References

South Africa

Supermarket chains
South Africa